Dyulevo is a village located near the town of Strelcha, western Bulgaria. The population is 305. There is an artificial pond in the vicinity where the road is raised.

Villages in Pazardzhik Province